Hillwoods Academy is a Senior Secondary School based in New Delhi. It was established in 1982. Rita Srivastava is the Principal/Head of the institution. Established in the year 1982, Hillwoods Academy at Preet Vihar, is affiliated to the C.B.S.E., New Delhi and prepares students for All India Senior Secondary School Examination.

Brands 
 Hillwoods Academy
 Hillwoods Academy School
 Hillwoods School

Hillwoods Academy School lists

Hillwoods Academy, Delhi 
Established in the year 1982, Hillwoods Academy at Preet Vihar, is affiliated to the C.B.S.E., New Delhi and prepares students for All India Senior Secondary School Examination.

Hillwoods Academy, Greater Noida 
Established in the year 2011, Hillwoods Academy at Greater Noida, is affiliated to the C.B.S.E., New Delhi and prepares students for All India Senior Secondary School Examination.

Hillwoods Academy, Gandhi Nagar 
Hillwoods School at Gandhi Nagar was established in the year 2000, and is affiliated to the C.B.S.E., New Delhi and prepares students for All India Senior Secondary School Examination. The school building was inaugurated by H.E. Kailashpati Mishra, the then Governor of Gujarat on 21st January 2004.

Academics 
Students scored 98.5% and 93.2% in Secondary and Senior Secondary School Examination, 2007. Regularly, the students have been getting merit certificates from C.B.S.E. which are given to students scoring in the top 0.01%.

Notable alumni 
 Manjot Singh

References

Schools in Delhi
1982 establishments in Delhi
Educational institutions established in 1982